The Oʻzbekiston Line is a line of the Tashkent Metro. Opened in 1984, it connects the northwestern districts of the city with the city centre and then continues eastwards.

Timeline

Name changes

Transfers

Tashkent Metro lines
Railway lines opened in 1984
1984 establishments in the Soviet Union